Felicia tenella is an annual, sometimes biennial, herbaceous plant that may be slightly woody at its base, of  tall, that is assigned to the family Asteraceae. The species is very variable in size and hairiness. The leaves have a callous tip, lack visible nerves, and are mostly rigidly ciliate. The flower heads sit individually at the tip of stalks, have an involucre of three whorls of bracts, and about thirty light blue ray florets surrounding many yellow disc florets. Four subspecies are recognised. The species naturally occurs in the Northern Cape and Western Cape provinces of South Africa.

Description 
The leaves are arranged alternately,  line-shaped in outline, broadly seated, up to 2 cm (1 in) long and 1 mm, rarely 1 mm (0.04–0.06 in) wide, dusky, rarely glabrous, somewhat succulent, with a decidedly bristly margin. No veins are visible. The upper parts of the stems carry leaves that are only slightly shorter than the lower leaves.

About thirty female ray florets have light blue straps of about 1 cm (0.4 in) long and 1 mm (0.06 in) wide. In the center of the head are many yellow, bisexual disc florets of about 2 mm (0.1 in) long. In the center of the corolla of each disc floret are five anthers merged into a tube, through which the style grows when the floret opens, hoovering up the pollen on its shaft. The style in both ray- and disc florets forks, and at the tip of both style branches is a broadly triangular appendage.

Surrounding the base of the corolla are many white, deciduous pappus bristles of about 2 mm (0.1 in) long, that are clearly serrated. The eventually black, dry, one-seeded, indehiscent fruits called cypselae are inverted egg-shaped, about 1 mm (0.06 in) long and  mm (0.02 in) wide, without a ridge along the margin, and set with spoon-shaped hairs on its surface.

The species is diploid with a base chromosome number of 9 (2n=18).

Differences between the subspecies 
Felicia tenella subsp. cotuloides grows to a height of only  and is also higher up richly branching and laxly covered in leaves. The plants are often reddish and densely covered in relatively large glands. The involucral bracts are blunt, hardly can a narrowed tip be observed.

It may have a woody base and flower more than one year. The involucral bracts are blunt, hardly can a narrowed tip be observed.

The shoots at the base do not develop roots, the flower heads are medium-sized, larger than in subsp. cotuloides but smaller than in subsp. tenella.

Taxonomy 
Aster tenellus, that was figured by the early English botanist Leonard Plukenet in 1692, was the first species recorded that is now included in the genus Felicia. The first to describe this species was Carl Linnaeus in 1763, based on a specimen from his private herbarium, and he called it Aster tenellus. In 1820, Henri Cassini described Felicia fragilis, which he erroneously considers to be synonymous to Aster fragilis L.. In 1822, Johann Heinrich Friedrich Link assigned Linnaeus’ species to the genus Cineraria, creating C. tenella. In 1833, Nees von Esenbeck included the species in the genus Felicia, creating the new combination F. tenella. William Henry Harvey distinguished Aster tenellus var. robustus in 1865. David Moore again moved the species in 1899, now to the genus Detris, that is currently considered a synonym of Felicia, creating the name D. tenella. Jürke Grau in his 1973 Revision of the genus Felicia, distinguished four subspecies, and assigned all the above names to subspecies tenella.
 
In 1828, Kurt Polycarp Joachim Sprengel described Kaulfussia ciliata.
Augustin Pyramus de Candolle described Felicia cotuloides and F. longifolia in 1836.
Harvey regarded these as Aster tenellus var. cotuloides and var. longifolia respectively, and also distinguished the new var. pusilla in 1865. Grau in 1973 made the new combinations Felicia tenella subsp. longifolia, subsp. cotuloides and subsp. pusilla, the first being a synonym of Kaulfussia ciliata.

Typical representatives of all four subspecies are quite distinctive, and three of them were considered individual species in the past. Grau however, notes that the four taxa grade into each other, and gave them subspecies status.

The species name tenella is Latin and  means "somewhat tender".

Distribution, conservation and cultivation 
Felicia tenella subsp. tenella is most abundant on the Cape Peninsula, but also occurs near Worcester and Hopefield. Subsp. cotuloides occupies a strip between Calvinia in the north to Bredasdorp in the south. Subsp. longifolia ranges from the Cape Peninsula to Riversdale in the east, where it occurs in dunes. Subsp. pusilla stretches from the Cape Peninsula to Vanrhynsdorp in the north. The continued survival of all four subspecies of Felicia tenella is considered to be of least concern, because their populations are stable. The species has been cultivated in Europe for a long time.

References

External links 
 photos on iNaturalist
 line drawings of subsp. tenella and subsp. longifolia
 line drawings of subsp. pussilla and subsp. cotuloides
 distribution map

tenella
Flora of Southern Africa
Flora of South Tropical Africa
Plants described in 1763
Taxa named by Carl Linnaeus